Ghostface (alternatively stylized as Ghost Face or GhostFace) is a fictional identity that is adopted by the primary antagonists of the Scream franchise. The figure was originally created by Kevin Williamson, and is primarily mute in person but voiced over the phone by Roger L. Jackson, regardless of who is behind the mask (as all killers use a voice changer utilizing that exact voice, starting in person with Scream 2). The disguise has been adopted by various characters in the movies and in the third season of the television series.

Ghostface first appeared in Scream (1996) as a disguise used by teenagers Billy Loomis (Skeet Ulrich) and Stu Macher (Matthew Lillard), during their killing spree in the fictional town of Woodsboro. The mask was a popular Halloween costume created and designed by Fun World costume company before being chosen by Marianne Maddalena and Craven for the film. The identity is used primarily as a disguise for the antagonists of each film to conceal their identities while conducting serial murders, and as such has been portrayed by several actors.

In the Scream universe, the costume is not unique and is easily obtainable, allowing others to wear a similar outfit. Ghostface often calls their targets to taunt or threaten them while using a voice changer that hides their true identity. In Scream 3, this is taken further when Ghostface uses a device that enables him to sound like several other characters, in order to manipulate targets. The changing identity of the person beneath the mask means that Ghostface has no definite motivation, ranging from revenge and seeking fame to peer pressure. In the first three movies, each killer shares the common goal of killing Sidney Prescott (Neve Campbell) due to a chain of events that started when Sidney's estranged half-brother, Roman Bridger (Scott Foley), told Billy his father had had an affair with Sidney's mother Maureen (Lynn McRee). In the fourth movie, the killers are jealous of Sidney's notoriety and plan to kill her so they too can become famous. From the fifth film onwards, the focus shifts to Billy's daughter, Samantha "Sam" Carpenter (Melissa Barrera) and her half-sister, Tara (Jenna Ortega), who are targeted due to their connection to Billy. In these later installments, the new Ghostface killers have motives that may sometimes be connected to the in-universe Stab film series, loose adaptations of the tell-all books about previous Ghostface killings by Gale Weathers (Courteney Cox), with Sam also assuming the Ghostface mantle herself in order to kill other Ghostfaces.

The Ghostface persona remains the same throughout the Scream series, featuring a black hood and cloak with a jagged base and a white rubber mask resembling a ghost with an anguish expression. Though each iteration of Ghostface is human, they often exhibit extreme durability against physical harm, high levels of physical strength, and an almost supernatural stealth ability, able to appear and disappear in seemingly impossible situations. The character has often appeared in popular culture since its inception, referenced in film and television as well as spawning a series of action figures and merchandise, as well as parodies and titular spoofs.

In the 2015–2016 television series Scream, Ghostface is adapted as the Lakewood Slasher, who appeared in the series for the first two seasons, and the Shallow Grove Slasher, who appeared in the Halloween special episodes of the second season; both are voiced by Mike Vaughn, with a different mask due to copyright issues. The original Ghostface persona returned in Scream: Resurrection, once again voiced by Roger L. Jackson, replacing Vaughn. In the movies, Ghostface has appeared in all entries to date, returning most recently in Scream (2022) and Scream VI, with Jackson reprising his role, now credited as "The Voice".

Appearances

Films

Ghostface first appears in the opening scene of Scream (1996). The character, voiced by Roger L. Jackson, calls and taunts teenager Casey Becker (Drew Barrymore) with horror clichés and trivia questions, eventually murdering her boyfriend Steve Orth (Kevin Patrick Walls) and then her. The identity has been adopted by the primary antagonists of each successive film to conceal their identities, prior to being revealed in each film's final act.

In the original Scream, the identity is used by a killer stalking the fictional town of Woodsboro, California. After the murder spree begins, Sidney Prescott (Neve Campbell) begins receiving taunting and threatening phone calls from Ghostface, who claims knowledge of her mother Maureen Prescott (Lynn McRee)'s brutal rape and murder, one year prior to the events of the film, a murder that was blamed on Cotton Weary (Liev Schreiber). The Ghostface disguise allows suspicion to fall on many people, including Sidney's boyfriend, Billy Loomis (Skeet Ulrich); her father, Neil Prescott (Lawrence Hecht); her friend, Randy Meeks (Jamie Kennedy); and her schoolmate, Stu Macher (Matthew Lillard). Ghostface is revealed in the finale as both Billy and Stu, who reveal that they murdered Sidney's mother and framed Cotton. Billy cites his motivation as abandonment by his mother, brought about by his father's affair with Maureen, while Stu cites "peer pressure". Sidney is able to gain an advantage against Billy and Stu, temporarily adopting the Ghostface persona herself to taunt them before killing Stu. Gale Weathers (Courteney Cox) shoots Billy to stop him from killing Sidney, who then finishes Billy off with a bullet to the head, citing the fact that "They ALWAYS come back," a common horror cliché, and now her catchphrase. This is most likely one of the many tropes taught to her by Randy Meeks, who is obsessed with horror and openly lists these clichés earlier in the film during a party.

Ghostface's second appearance was in Scream 2 (1997) where it was again used as a disguise by the main antagonists. A series of murders occur at Windsor College, Sidney's current location, with the initial victims sharing names with Billy and Stu's victims from Scream. The killers again taunt Sidney and attempt to kill her, and later kill Randy. The Ghostface disguise allows suspicion to fall on several characters, including Cotton again, and Sidney's boyfriend Derek Feldman (Jerry O'Connell). However, Mickey Altieri (Timothy Olyphant), a friend of Derek, reveals himself as the killer, seeking fame for his prolific exploits. Mickey's accomplice is revealed to be Billy's mother (Laurie Metcalf), under the alias Debbie Salt, who is seeking revenge against Sidney for her son's death, while showing unwillingness to accept her own faults as a mother which included abandoning Billy, which Sidney points out during their confrontation. Mrs. Loomis shoots Mickey, claiming to have indulged his desire for fame only to enlist his help in enacting her revenge, and tries to kill Sidney. When Cotton arrives, Mrs. Loomis tries to manipulate him into letting her kill Sidney, but to her shock, she fails to do so and Cotton instead shoots Mrs. Loomis in the neck. Seconds later, Mickey springs to his feet screaming but is quickly shot to death by Gale and Sidney. Sidney then shoots Mrs. Loomis in the head.

In Scream 3 (2000), a new Ghostface killer murders Cotton and his girlfriend Christine Hamilton (Kelly Rutherford) in an attempt to discover the now-hidden Sidney's location. The killer leaves images of Maureen at the crime scenes to draw Sidney out of seclusion while murdering the cast of "Stab 3", the film within a film based on Sidney and her experiences with Ghostface. Ghostface is revealed as Sidney's half-brother, film director Roman Bridger (Scott Foley), born to their mother Maureen during a two-year period when she moved to Hollywood to become an actress under the name Rina Reynolds. After being gang-raped and impregnated at a party, she gave Roman up for adoption; Roman sought her out years later, only to be rejected, telling him that he's Rina's child. Roman began stalking Maureen and filming her relationships with other men, including Hank Loomis. He used this footage to reveal to Billy why his mother had abandoned him before convincing him to kill Maureen, sparking the chain of events in Scream and Scream 2. As Roman rants on his motive and desire to frame and kill Sidney for "stealing the life she took from him", Sidney shuts him up, saying that she's heard those rants before from other killers and that he simply kills people because he chose to, provoking an enraged Roman into fighting Sidney, which she eventually wins by outsmarting Roman and stabbing him in the back and chest, while Gale and Dewey Riley (David Arquette) arrive shortly after and discover his identity, ruining Roman's plans of framing Sidney for his crimes. A defeated Roman briefly connects with Sidney by holding her hand, but then attempts to attack once more. Dewey manages to ultimately kill Roman with Sidney's help, ending the series of murders based on his revenge against Maureen.

In the director's commentary, the Stab 3 "Sidney Prescott" actress Angelina Tyler (Emily Mortimer) is revealed to have been a second killer and Roman's lover, with the scenes revealing her survival and true allegiances after apparently being killed by Ghostface having been cut; Wes Craven elaborated that an earlier scene in the film where Sidney came across Angelina wearing Ghostface gear in her dressing room, which Angelina had passed off as still wearing due to just having come off of set, was Sidney unknowingly actually having caught Angelina in the act of changing into her Ghostface gear, furthermore leaving it ambiguous as to whether or not Angelina was actually dead or could return; in the subsequent Scream Trilogy box set booklet, Angelina is not listed among the deceased characters after the events of Scream 3. Ghostface is also voiced by Foley, Schreiber, Lynn McRee, Campbell, Cox, David Arquette, Beth Toussaint, and Ulrich via a voice changer used to impersonate them.

In Scream 4 (2011), another Ghostface killer emerges in Woodsboro on the 15th anniversary of the massacre conducted by Billy and Stu; the new killer recreates events from the incident but also films the murders to create a snuff film. Ghostface kills several teenagers and police officers before being unmasked as Sidney's cousin Jill Roberts (Emma Roberts) and her friend Charlie Walker (Rory Culkin), who intend to kill Sidney, frame Jill's ex-boyfriend Trevor Sheldon (Nico Tortorella), and become the current generation's "Sidney Prescott" and "Randy Meeks" with the accompanying fame of being the "survivors" of the massacre, as Jill was jealous of Sidney's experiences with Ghostface. Jill betrays Charlie and stabs him through the heart, wishing to become the sole survivor, and after admitting to Sidney that she really is a sick, evil woman who was willing to kill her own mother Kate (Mary McDonnell) to get what she wants, declaring that "sick is the new sane", she then seemingly kills Sidney before purposely injuring and stabbing herself to make herself appear a victim of Ghostface. After being taken to the hospital, Jill's plans end up backfiring when Dewey informs her that Sidney has survived. An enraged Jill makes a desperate attempt to kill Sidney, but is stalled by Dewey, Gale, and Judy Hicks (Marley Shelton) long enough for Sidney to electrocute her on the head with a defibrillator, saying that Jill forgot the first rule of remakes, "Don't fuck with the original". An injured Jill attempts to stab Sidney with a piece of broken glass in a last-ditch attempt to finish her off, but Sidney anticipates this and shoots Jill through the heart, finally killing her, while Jill's status as the "sole surviving hero" ultimately becomes short-lived.

In Scream (2022), the fifth installment of the franchise, two obsessive and toxic fans of the in-universe horror film series Stab, Amber Freeman and Richard "Richie Kirsch" Bailey (Mikey Madison and Jack Quaid, respectively), set out to create a real-life "requel" (half reboot, half sequel) of the films after they were disappointed with recent installments, while also showing unawareness of their own toxic nature and believing they're "real fans" that can save the Stab franchise by "restoring" it to its normal formula. They focus their attacks on people related to Billy and Stu's original killing spree, with Dewey ending up becoming one of the victims, and intend to frame Richie's girlfriend Sam Carpenter (Melissa Barrera) for their crimes (Sam is the illegitimate daughter of Billy Loomis), but their plans are ultimately foiled by Sam, Sidney, Gale, and Sam's sister Tara Carpenter (Jenna Ortega), and Richie and Amber themselves are brutally killed. Amber is shot by Gale and falls straight into a burning kitchen stove, where she is set on fire, and is later shot in the head by Tara. Richie is violently stabbed by Sam, and as a frightened Richie pleads for his life and asks about "his ending", his throat is fatally slashed, and Sam then shoots Richie in the head to make sure he doesn't "come back". Sidney and Gale also choose to let the killers' identities be left anonymous to the world, ensuring that another Stab film based on these recent killings will not be made, although Gale is forced to renege on this promise in Scream VI, publishing another tell-all book about the killings.

In Scream VI (2023), it is revealed that Richie's father was a police detective named Wayne Bailey (Dermot Mulroney) and that Richie had a brother named Ethan (Jack Champion) and a sister named Quinn (Liana Liberato). Wayne encouraged Richie's obsession with the Stab franchise, exploiting his status as a police officer to steal various pieces of evidence in lockup from past Ghostface killings to make a Ghostface shrine to the franchise in an abandoned cinema. After Richie's death, Wayne desired to get revenge on the one who killed him, taking up the mantle of Ghostface himself and galvanizing his family to aid in his scheme. When Sam and the other three survivors ("Core Four") moved to New York, the Bailey family followed (Wayne transferring to the NYPD, and Ethan and Quinn becoming roommates with the "Core Four"). Eager to torment Sam, they spread rumors that Sam framed Richie for the previous murders to assassinate her character. They then kill a rival pair of Ghostfaces seeking to "finish Richie's movie" — Jason Carvey (Tony Revolori) and his best friend Greg Bruckner (Thom Newell) — to prevent their plans from interfering with their own, and start a new killing spree around New York, killing or injuring anyone that got in their way or was close to Sam, intending to frame Sam for their crimes and kill her after. In the final confrontation, the Bailey family confronts Sam, Tara, and FBI agent Kirby Reed (Hayden Panettiere), but the trio ultimately gains the upper hand after Sam taunts them with the fact that Richie never managed to kill a lot of victims himself (Amber committed the majority of the murders), before having died cowardly and pleading for his life. In the ensuing fight, Tara seriously wounds Ethan and Sam kills Quinn by shooting her in the head, while Wayne is knocked unconscious. When he wakes up, Wayne finds himself receiving a phone call from Ghostface, who taunts him over his motives and stabs a now-frightened Wayne multiple times, before unmasking herself as Sam. Sam considers letting Wayne live, but ultimately chooses to kill him by stabbing him in the eye for "messing with her family". Soon after, a wounded Ethan attempts to attack once more, only for Kirby to push a damaged TV (the same one that killed Stu Macher years ago) onto Ethan's head, killing him.

Television series
Ghostface made an appearance in the third season of the anthology television slasher series Scream. The season, titled Scream: Resurrection, premiered on VH1 on July 8, 2019. In this season, the killers are revealed in the episode "Endgame": Beth (Giorgia Whigham) and Jamal "Jay" Elliot (Tyga).

Video games
Ghostface is featured as a killer in the asymmetrical multiplayer survival horror game, Dead by Daylight, voiced by Filip Ivanovic. He was added in the Ghost Face DLC released on June 18, 2019, under the alias "The Ghost Face." In the game, Ghostface's real identity is Danny Johnson, known by the pseudonym Jed Olsen, a narcissistic freelancer newspaper journalist in the fictional town of Roseville, Florida, who covers the Ghostface murders by day and commits them by night. This version of Ghostface is an original character who was created exclusively for the game and has no relation to the Scream franchise. This is because the developers were only able to acquire the license for the Scream mask, which is separate from the one for the character, as the films used a pre-existing mask. Players can access different styles of the mask for Ghostface in Dead by Daylight.

Ghostface appears as a playable operator in Season Six of Call of Duty: Black Ops Cold War and Call of Duty: Warzone. Roger L. Jackson reprises his role as the voice of Ghostface.

In April 2022, Ghostface was added in an update as a free playable skin for a limited time in the online multiplayer social deduction game Among Us.

Concept and creation

The Ghostface costume is the outfit worn by the main antagonists of the Scream franchise, consisting of a rubber white mask with black eyes, nose, and mouth and black, cloth-like material; a hooded robe, with faux-tatters draping from the arms; and a spiked trim to the base of the outfit. In the movie, the costume is considered common and easily purchasable, making identifying the buyers difficult and creating the possibility for anyone to be the killer.

The Ghostface mask was first developed for novelty stores during the Halloween season between 1991 and 1992 by Fun World, as part of a series entitled "Fantastic Faces", the mask itself known as "The Peanut-Eyed Ghost". The final design was approved by Fun World vice-President Allan Geller. Craven claimed to have originally found the mask but later clarified that he had misremembered the event and that it was producer Marianne Maddalena who discovered it. She found it while inside a house during location scouting for the film and brought it to the attention of Craven, who set about trying to obtain the rights to use it. Fun World licensing director R.J. Torbert joined Fun World in 1996 and was given the task of naming the mask prior to its film debut, deciding on "GhostFace" with the blessing of Fun World owners Stanley and Allan Geller. Torbert felt it looked like a "ghost in pain", believing it to be a unique design. The Ghostface design and title are owned by Fun World.

The design of the mask bears reference to Edvard Munch's painting The Scream, the film poster to Pink Floyd's The Wall, and the ghostly characters that appeared in the 1930s Betty Boop cartoons. The mask is stark white and depicts a caricature of someone screaming and crying at the same time. Designer Sleiertin stated that the mask displayed different emotions, "It's a horrible look, it's a sorry look, it's a frantic look". Since the appearance of Ghostface in Scream, the costume has become the most worn and sold costume for Halloween in the United States.

The initial script labeled the main antagonist as "masked killer" with no specifications to its appearance, forcing Craven and his staff to produce the costume eventually worn by Ghostface as they were shooting. Craven asked Greg Nicotero and Howard Berger of design company KNB Effects to produce a mask specifically for the film based on the Fun World design, but did not like the final result. After Fun World and Dimension Films were able to complete an agreement for the use of the Ghostface mask, Craven was able to use the original design as he wanted. The custom mask made by KNB Effects still appears in the scenes involving the murders of Casey Becker and Principal Himbry, as filming of these scenes completed prior to the finalization of the deal between Fun World and Dimension Films.

The 1991–92 "Fantastic Faces" edition of the mask used in Scream is made of thin, white rubber with blackened eyes, nose, and mouth. Despite being fictionally a character in the movie cast, in the first, second, and fourth films, the costume was most often worn by stunt performer Dane Farwell, who gave the character specific characteristics such as cleaning the knife after killing, also giving the stature and a unique movement to the character. In the first film, Craven wore the costume during the opening murder scene, where the character is struck by a phone, and by Ulrich only once during a finale scene, where the character prepares to murder Randy. Despite Stu wearing the costume in the film, actor Lillard never actually wore the outfit. Scream 2 features a slightly redesigned version of the mask from the "Fearsome Faces" line, possessing slightly-altered eyes and an indented chin. Following Scream 2, the Ghostface mask became part of the "Ghostface" line of masks featuring several variations of the design including glow-in-the-dark models. The plain, white version of the Ghostface line mask is used in Scream 3 by Bridger. Another edition of the mask was developed for use by Ghostface in Scream 4, dubbed "The Deluxe Edition Mask"; again, similar to the original Ghostface design, but constructed of thicker rubber with a pearlescent finish.

Following the description in Williamson's script of a "ghost mask", Craven and designers had originally intended to use a white motif, creating a white cloak and hood for the killer's costume. It was the intervention of Maddalena, who felt that the cloak would be scarier if it was black, that resulted in the dark costume shown on screen. The cloak itself had to be custom-made for the film, as the "Father Death" outfit identified in Scream as that of the killers did not really exist; the Fun World mask was sold only as a stand-alone item. The cloak entered into retail markets only following the release of Scream. Each cloak was estimated to cost $700 to hand-produce by a seamstress and was made of a heavy, thick, black material, with reflective threads woven throughout, creating a subtle glimmer. The cloak was created to help conceal the identity of the killers by covering most of their visible bodies, as it was believed that otherwise audiences would be able to guess which character was involved by his or her clothing and body-shape.

The knife used by Ghostface in the films is a custom prop knife based on the Buck 120 Hunting Knife, which has since been discontinued by its manufacturer. The knife blades are made of aluminum or chrome-paint-coated plastic with a rubber handle, depending on the scenario for which they are needed. The handle is black with a silver metallic appearance for the tip. The Buck 120 knife was chosen as the model for the Ghostface weapon because of the large blade it features.

Characterization
Ghostface is rarely depicted as speaking while physically on screen in order to aid in concealing the identity of the character behind the mask. Exceptions to this are grunts and groans when injured, which are dubbed into the film during the editing phase by Jackson. Ghostface only speaks physically on-screen on four occasions in the series; on the first two occasions, it is just before his true identity is revealed; the third occasion is the hospital scene in Scream (2022); the fourth occasion is the opening sequence in Scream VI. The voice given to the character, provided by Jackson, is used when talking to another character over the phone or to display the use of the voice changer when the killer reveals himself. Despite being portrayed by different characters in each film, Ghostface displays similar personality and physical attributes regardless of who is wearing the costume or speaking to a target, such as taunting his victims over the telephone, the ritualistic cleaning of his knife after a kill, slashing the throat of his victims before killing them by stabbing, almost superhuman strength and durability, and grunts and groans when injured.

Ghostface is first referred to by that name in the first movie, when character Tatum Riley, played by Rose McGowan, calls the masked killer "Mr. Ghostface", prior to her death.

Ghostface is often shown to taunt his targets, initially representing himself as charming and even flirtatious when speaking. His conversations turn confrontational and intimidating, using his knowledge of other characters or graphically describing his intentions before appearing to the target physically. Craven considers Jackson's voice performance as Ghostface to have "evil sophistication". When confronting his intended victim, Ghostface is portrayed in varying ways, sometimes quick and efficient and other times clumsy, falling, or colliding with objects that hinder his pursuit, a characteristic that varies based upon who is wearing the costume. Whoever inhabits the costume, Ghostface taunts its victims and prolongs a kill when it appears to have an advantage. The Billy/Stu Ghostface would gut its victims after killing them; this was not performed on Tatum Riley who was killed in a mechanical garage door. This Ghostface, in particular, would ask its victim questions about horror films and employ the tropes of the genre in its attacks, displaying a detachment from reality and aligned with the same self-awareness of the film itself which toys with the expectations of the horror genre. The second Ghostface, created by Mickey and Mrs. Loomis, would repeatedly stab its victim to death but often in a public place or with witnesses. The third Ghostface, created by Roman, preferred more clean kills with precise stabbings, and used theatricality and movie props to attack his victims, using a voice changer that allowed him to sound like many other people, casting suspicion and doubt on other characters. In addition, he would use images and the synthesized voice of Maureen to specifically taunt Sidney, even shrouding himself in a bloodied, crime scene cover, alluding to the murder of Maureen, to fool Sidney into believing that she was losing her sanity. The fourth Ghostface, created by Jill and Charlie, filmed each murder on web cameras hidden around the environment and spy cameras in its mask. Charlie mostly repeatedly stabbed his victims to death in a more vicious and brutal fashion and would go further and gut them if he wanted, while Jill mostly stabbed only once. The two killers also made some of the murders public to gain the attention of the world press. The fifth Ghostface, created by Richie and Amber, mainly focused on brutally attacking and injuring victims, while killing most of them in a swift manner. The sixth Ghostface, created by Richie's family, committed violent murders and attacks on either the ones close to Sam Carpenter or anyone standing in the way, while leaving the masks of previous Ghostface killers at the scene of the crime afterwards.

The motivations for Ghostface's killing vary in each film and are respective to each killer wearing the costume. Billy claimed to have been driven to insanity by his mother's abandonment, an incident he blamed on Maureen, and after taking his revenge on her chose to continue his spree, leading towards her daughter Sidney, while Stu lists peer pressure as his motivation. In Scream 2, Mrs. Loomis cites her motivation as simple revenge against the person she holds responsible for her son's death, while Mickey desires the fame that his involvement in the killings will garner when he is caught. In Scream 3, Roman seeks revenge for what he sees as his mother's rejection and abandonment by engineering Maureen's death and trying to kill Sidney, seeing her as having the family-life he was denied. In Scream 4, Jill, jealous of Sidney, wished to obtain similar fame as the sole survivor of a new massacre, while Charlie aided her both for those reasons and his love for Jill. In Scream (2022), Richie and Amber, who are shown to be extremely toxic fans of the Stab franchise, start a huge killing spree in an effort to inspire a ninth Stab film that goes back to the franchise's old formula, having hated the eighth film (which was written and directed by Rian Johnson) for its new storytelling elements that stepped away from the old formula. In Scream VI, Detective Wayne Bailey and his son and daughter, Ethan and Quinn, who are revealed to be Richie's family, desire to get revenge on the one who killed Richie by assassinating her character and framing her for a new killing spree.

In costume, the Ghostfaces share a ritualistic mannerism of gripping the blade of its knife between thumb and forefinger and wiping it clean of any blood following a murder by drawing its hand from handle to the tip of the knife. This characteristic was given to the character by stuntman Dane Farwell who wore the costume for many of its scenes in Scream. Each killer is depicted as possessing effective physical abilities, such as the capabilities of nearly flawless stealth, prowling without being detected, moving silently, and efficiently vanishing from its targets' defense. Additionally, the killer tends to display sufficient strength that allows them to overpower victims, such as in Scream 2, in regards to defeating two trained detectives single-handedly. Ghostface is shown to be able to sustain and even ignore severe levels of physical damage, surviving blunt trauma, stabbing wounds and gunshots. While Stu, Mrs. Loomis, Charlie, Richie, Quinn, and Wayne were all killed instantly in one blow, Billy, Mickey, Roman, Jill, Amber, and Ethan, despite having sustained severe injuries prior, all survived to make one final, desperate attack before finally being killed by the heroes.

Cultural impact

McFarlane Toys produced a 6-inch figurine of Ghostface in 1999 for the "Movie Maniacs II" series of horror and science fiction inspired line of character models. A series of figures were produced by NECA for Scream 4 featuring the standard mask and black cowl plus variations such as "Zombie Ghostface" with a decayed appearance on the mask and "Scarecrow Ghostface" with brown, burlap material used for the mask and clothing.

Ghostface has been parodied and referenced numerous times in media following his appearance in the Scream franchise, most prominently in the parody film Scary Movie (2000) where a killer dressed as Ghostface commits a series of murders. However, unlike the original film, the killer is revealed to be a single person; this parodic version of Ghostface later appears in the June 1, 2016 Erma comic strip, named "Prank Call", wherein the character is making prank calls whilst quoting Scream, alongside the series' titular character. In the parody film Shriek If You Know What I Did Last Friday the 13th (2000), a killer wearing a Jason Voorhees-style hockey mask is set on fire, his mask melting to resemble that of Ghostface. The film Jay and Silent Bob Strike Back (2001) features Ghostface, as Shannen Doherty and Craven provide cameos as themselves making the then non-existent Scream 4, but Doherty objects when Ghostface turns out to be played by the orangutan, Suzann.

As in film, Ghostface has been referenced repeatedly in various television programs and commercials. In the same year as the release of Scream 3, the mask made an appearance on Beverly Hills, 90210 and the Nickelodeon series Cousin Skeeter. It was also used as an ornament in the bedroom of Dawson Leery in Dawson's Creek, a show created by Scream writer, Williamson. The character appears in a 1999 episode of Celebrity Deathmatch entitled "The Unknown Murderer", where he threatens to kill a scream queen every round, murdering Barrymore, Jamie Lee Curtis, and Jennifer Love Hewitt before planting his cell phone on a platypus to frame him, causing Campbell and Sarah Michelle Gellar to fight it. The mask was later used in The Sopranos episode "Fortunate Son" (2001) where it is worn by the character Christopher to commit a robbery.

The costume is referenced in an episode of the television series Boomtown entitled "All Hallow's Eve" (2002) where a police officer uses the costume to frighten a bully who has been terrorizing other kids. In the Japanese anime FLCL episode "Marquis de Cabras" (2003), protagonist Naota's face changes to resemble that of Ghostface frequently during a scene where he and his family are eating spicy curry. The character makes a cameo appearance in Tripping the Rift in the episode "The Devil and a Guy Named Webster" (2004) as the judge when Chode sells his soul to the devil and finds a way to sue him. He also appears in a 2004 advert for Trivial Pursuit: '90s edition; representing iconic characters of the 1990s alongside Dennis Rodman and the character Rose from the 1997 film Titanic. A parody of Ghostface appears in the television series All Grown Up! episode "Interview with a Campfire" (2004) where Lil DeVille is taunted by phone and stalked by a character wearing an Easter Bunny mask.

The character appears briefly in The Simpsons episode "Home Away from Homer" (2005) where Homer Simpson suggests him as a babysitter for his daughter Maggie Simpson. Roger L. Jackson lends his voice to Ghostface in the Robot Chicken episode "That Hurts Me" (2005) alongside other famous film killers in a show that parodies Big Brother, launching a prank war against Pinhead and Freddy Krueger before giving a speech to save himself from elimination from the show. He is referenced by Kenny Powers, the main character of Eastbound & Down who requests to wear the mask while having sex. In Scream XXX: A porn parody, a new Ghostface (wearing a clown variant of the Father Death mask) begins murdering the cast and crew of an in-production pornographic parody of the Stab series. In another porn parody, the gay movie Moan, the version of Ghostface seen in the film does not wear a mask. Instead, he has a hood and facepaint that resembles the mask (presembly, this change was made to help make the movie more erotic).

In his book Going to Pieces: The Rise and Fall of the Slasher Film, Adam Rockoff opined that Ghostface's mask was a "striking, surreal and downright terrifying presence". Calling the mask a "hyperbolic rendering" of Edvard Munch's The Scream, Rockoff wrote that the face is "twisted in an exaggerated, almost mocking grin, as if reflecting the look of terror and surprise on his victims' faces." Tony Magistrale also discussed the similarities between Ghostface's mask and The Scream in his book Abject Terrors: Surveying the Modern and Postmodern Horror Film, stating that the painting, "an apt representation of the degree of alienation from other people, inspires the killers' murderous agenda".

Notes

References

External links

 Ghostface.co.uk
 HelloSidney

Fictional blackmailers
Fictional murderers of children
Fictional code names
Fictional costumes
Fictional knife-fighters
Fictional mass murderers
Fictional serial killers
Film characters introduced in 1996
Halloween costume
Masks in the Americas
Scream (franchise) characters
Slasher film antagonists